Lee Randall is a former Republican member of the Montana Legislature. He was first elected to District 39 of the House of Representatives in 2008, after which he assumed that office on January 5, 2009. Randall served District 39 in the 2009, 2011, and 2013 legislative sessions until being redistricted in 2015, and represented District 37, which encompassed all of Carter, Garfield, McCone, and Prairie Counties, and parts of Fallon, Powder River and Wibaux Counties until January 2, 2017.

Randall served as Speaker Pro Tempore during the 2015-2016 session.

References

Living people
Year of birth missing (living people)
Republican Party members of the Montana House of Representatives
People from Powder River County, Montana